The 1955 Bolivian Primera División, the first division of Bolivian football (soccer), was played by 11 teams. The champion was San José.

Torneo Integrado

Standings

External links
 Official website of the LFPB 

Bolivian Primera División seasons
Bolivia
1955 in Bolivian sport